The Men's 100m Breaststroke event at the 2006 Central American and Caribbean Games occurred on Monday, July 17, 2006 at the S.U. Pedro de Heredia Aquatic Complex in Cartagena, Colombia.

Records

Results

Final

Preliminaries

References

Breaststroke, Men's 100m